The Church of Santiago Apóstol (Spanish: Iglesia Parroquial de Santiago Apóstol) is a church located in Villa del Prado, Spain. It was declared Bien de Interés Cultural in 1981.

References 

Santiago Apostol, Villa Del Prado
Bien de Interés Cultural landmarks in the Community of Madrid